Vatica ridleyana is a species of plant in the family Dipterocarpaceae. It is a tree found in Sumatra and Singapore. It is a critically endangered species threatened by habitat loss.

References

ridleyana
Trees of Sumatra
Trees of Singapore
Critically endangered flora of Asia
Taxonomy articles created by Polbot